This article shows the rosters of all participating teams at the 2019 FIVB Volleyball Men's World Cup in Japan.

The following is the Argentine roster in the 2019 FIVB Volleyball Men's World Cup.

Head coach: Marcelo Méndez

The following is the Australian roster in the 2019 FIVB Volleyball Men's World Cup.

Head coach: Mark Lebedew

The following is the Brazilian roster in the 2019 FIVB Volleyball Men's World Cup.

Head coach: Renan Dal Zotto

The following is the Canadian roster in the 2019 FIVB Volleyball Men's World Cup.

Head coach: Daniel Lewis

The following is the Egyptian roster in the 2019 FIVB Volleyball Men's World Cup.

Head Coach: Gido Vermeulen

The following is the Iranian roster in the 2019 FIVB Volleyball Men's World Cup.

Head coach: Igor Kolaković

The following is the Italian roster in the 2019 FIVB Volleyball Men's World Cup.

Head coach: Gianlorenzo Blengini

The following is the Japanese roster in the 2019 FIVB Volleyball Men's World Cup.

Head coach: Yuichi Nakagaichi

The following is the Polish roster in the 2019 FIVB Volleyball Men's World Cup.

Head coach: Vital Heynen

The following is the Russian roster in the 2019 FIVB Volleyball Men's World Cup.

Head coach: Tuomas Sammelvuo

The following is the Tunisian roster in the 2019 FIVB Volleyball Men's World Cup.

Head Coach: Antonio Giaccobe

The following is the American roster in the 2019 FIVB Volleyball Men's World Cup.

Head coach: John Speraw

See also
2019 FIVB Volleyball Women's World Cup squads

References

External links
Official website

squads
FIVB Volleyball Men's World Cup squads